Joseph Henry Eberly is the Professor of Physics and Professor of Optics at the University of Rochester.

Education
Eberly earned his bachelor's degree from Pennsylvania State University in 1957 and his Ph.D. in Physics from Stanford University in 1962.

Work
Eberly's research interests focus on: cavity QED; quantum information and control of non-classical entanglement (including sudden death and sudden birth of entanglement); response of atoms to high-intensity optical pulses; coherent control theory of optical interactions, including soliton and adiabaton propagation. In 1995, with funding from the National Science Foundation, he founded the Rochester Theory Center for Optical Science and Engineering (RTC). The Center, under Eberly's directorship, provides postdoctoral training in frontier areas of optical science and technology to selected young Ph.D. theorists from U.S. universities.

Eberly's early discovery of the full quantum revival in the Jaynes-Cummings model which is a kind of resurrection of the quantum system after a very long time as the physically measurable non-thermodynamical example of the quantum Poincaré recurrence theorem in the finite time limit has a striking consequences on the theory of the quantum consciousness in unitary universe and the theory of life self-creation and probability of alien life.

In one of his first papers "Electron Self-Energy in Intense Plane-Wave Field” in Physical Review in 1966 he independently implicitly discovered in electrodynamics the Higgs mechanism i.e.  how the massless particles field can gain the mass through the interaction with the Higgs field - the laser field if the Dirac field was the massless gauge field.  Eberly is also recognized as a pioneer in the theory of atomic vapor laser isotope separation.

Awards and recognition
Eberly has been the recipient of the Charles Hard Townes Award, the Smoluchowski Medal and the Senior Humboldt Award.  He was the president of the Optical Society of America in 2007.  For his outstanding contributions in the theory of electron localization in atoms
and molecules he was awarded in 2010 the Frederic Ives Medal, the highest award of the Optical Society of America and in 2021 he became the Honorary Member of the OSA successor Optica.
He has strong research ties to Poland that started from sharing his office with Polish physicist Adam Kujawski in the 60s, continued with longtime scientific collaboration with Iwo Bialynicki-Birula and culminated in becoming a Foreign Member of the Academy of Sciences of Poland. He also has multiple publications with Kazimierz Rzazewski,  both the MSc and the PhD supervisor of Maciej Lewenstein who pointed out that the superradiant phase transition originally discovered at the University of Rochester is physically not possible without an "extraterrestrial" ether with  both the real and negative dielectric constant filling the quantum vacuum which is less than one because the classical electromagnetic gauge fields can be always eliminated from the statistical sum totally and therefore cannot cause any phase transition (electromagnetic version of Bohr–van Leeuwen theorem).

Publications
Eberly has published more than 300 scientific journal articles and other scientific papers.  He has co-written two textbooks and has contributed chapters to many more.
 L. Allen and J.H. Eberly, Optical Resonance and Two-Level Atoms. 1987. .
 P. Milonni and J.H. Eberly, Lasers. 1988. .
 Sudden Death of Entanglement by Ting Yu and J. H. Eberly, Science 30 January 2009: Vol. 323. no. 5914, pp. 598 - 601,

References

External links
Past Presidents of the Optical Society of America
Optics and Photonics News interview with Prof. J. H. Eberly
Prof. J. H. Eberly on the history and importance of the paperless modern dynamic and possibly interactive multimedia interconnected network publishing in pioneering Optics Express
Prof. J. H. Eberly about the NAVY military research genesis of his science career in the movie interview

Living people
21st-century American physicists
Optical physicists
Quantum physicists
Theoretical physicists
Fellows of Optica (society)
University of Rochester faculty
Presidents of Optica (society)
American textbook writers
American male non-fiction writers
Fellows of the American Physical Society
Year of birth missing (living people)